The 1994 FIA 2-Litre World Rally Cup was the second season of the FIA 2-Litre World Rally Cup, an auto racing championship recognized by the Fédération Internationale de l'Automobile, running in support of the World Rally Championship. It was created for cars with engine size below 2 Litres. The championship was composed of eight rallies, and only manufacturers competed for championship.

General Motors Europe was the defending champion.

Calendar

Season summary

FIA 2-Litre World Rally Cup

External links
 FIA World Rally Championship 1994 at rallybase.nl
 1994 FIA 2-Litre World Rally Cup at [http://www.ewrc-results.com ewrc-results.com]

World Rally Championship
FIA 2-Litre World Rally Cup